Lynn Oliphant is a professor emeritus from the Department of Veterinary Biomedical Sciences, University of Saskatchewan, and founding member of the Prairie Institute for Human Ecology.

He received a Ph.D. in Zoology from the University of Washington and moved to Saskatchewan in 1971.

Oliphant ran as a Green Party of Canada candidate in 2004 for Saskatoon-Blackstrap, and has also run in two provincial elections for the New Green Alliance.

Lynn Oliphant received a Canadian Environment Award in 2005 for his vision and support of the Craik Sustainable Living Project.

External links
 Canadian Geographic Environmental Community Award, 2005
 Emma Lake Campus - biography

Sustainability advocates
People from Saskatoon
Canadian environmentalists
Green Party of Canada candidates in the 2004 Canadian federal election
Academic staff of the University of Saskatchewan
Saskatchewan candidates for Member of Parliament
Living people
Candidates in Saskatchewan provincial elections
Year of birth missing (living people)